Achatinella decipiens is a species of air-breathing land snail, a terrestrial pulmonate gastropod mollusk in the family Achatinellidae. This species is endemic to Hawaii.

Cooke considered Achatinella decipiens to be a subspecies of Achatinella byronii.

Shell description
The rough sinistral (eastern range) or smooth dextral (western range) shell is conically-elongate, solid, slightly rounded, and margined above. The shell has six whorls. The aperture is elongately-ovate and the lip is subreflected. The columella is short, obliquely twisted and has an expanded callus. The suture is slightly impressed with numerous longitudinal, oblique striae. Shell color is white with yellow transverse bands, or yellow with white transverse lines and longitudinal chestnut colored stripes.

The height of the shell is 20.5 mm. The width of the shell is 9.0 mm.

References
This article incorporates public domain text (a public domain work of the United States Government) from reference.

decipiens
Molluscs of Hawaii
Endemic fauna of Hawaii
Critically endangered fauna of the United States
Gastropods described in 1854
Taxonomy articles created by Polbot
ESA endangered species